John J. Britt was a member (and president between 1953–54) of the Collectors Club of New York. He was awarded the Lichtenstein Medal in 1961 for his contributions to philately.

Philatelic literature
John Britt authored various studies including:
 French Colonial Semi-Postal Air Mail Proofs of the "French State" (Vichy)

Retirement
John Britt, a past president of the Collectors Club of New York, retired to Florida. In 1969, he and seven other philatelists reorganized a tiny stamp club of only a dozen members into the Hollywood Stamp Club in Hollywood, Florida, one of the largest and most active stamp clubs in the nation.  He was elected Chairman of the Board of the Hollywood Stamp Club, a post he retained for many years in the 1960s and 1970s.

See also
 Philately
 Philatelic literature

References

 The Collectors Club of New York
 John J. Britt
  Fellows of the Society - Britt

American philatelists
Philatelic literature
Year of birth missing
Year of death missing